"Io sì (Seen)" ("I Yes") is a song written by Diane Warren, Laura Pausini and Niccolò Agliardi, and recorded by Pausini for the soundtrack of the 2020 film The Life Ahead. The song was produced by Greg Wells and released as a digital single on 23 October 2020. On 30 October 2020, the song was released for airplay to Italian mainstream radios.

"Io sì (Seen)" won the awards for Song of the Year at the Capri Hollywood International Film Festival, Best International Song at the CinEuphoria Awards, Master in Music Award at the Los Angeles Italia Film Festival, Outstanding Song – Feature Film at the 11th Hollywood Music in Media Awards, Best Original Song at the 25th Satellite Awards and the award with the same name at the 78th Golden Globe Awards (the first non-English song to win the award and Pausini the first Italian singer ever to win the prize). The song won “Migliore canzone originale” at the 75th Nastro d’Argento Awards. It also received nominations for Best Original Song at the 93rd Academy Awards, making it the first song sung entirely in Italian to be nominated, and for Best Song at the 26th Critics' Choice Awards.

Background and composition
"Io sì (Seen)" is a power ballad. Diane Warren wrote the original version of the song, with English-language lyrics, specifically for the film The Life Ahead, and involved Pausini in the project during the summer of 2020. After watching the film, Pausini accepted to perform the song, identifying herself in its message about diversity and against prejudice, racism, also talks about the hard life of orphaned or poor children, people struggling to have or adopt children, to people who are invisible and need to be seen and especially to the difficult situation that the world lives in these times. Pausini translated the song in Italian with her frequent collaborator Niccolò Agliardi. Despite being used to compose instinctively, Pausini and Agliardi worked on the lyrics adaptation for 25 days, since she wanted to be sure to respect the film's meaning.

The song was produced, mixed, with most instruments played by Greg Wells, and recorded in Romagna in Pausini's home studio built in her parents' house. The film only features the Italian-language version of the song, but it was also recorded by Pausini in English, Spanish, French and Portuguese. The strings were arranged by David Campbell and recorded in Prague with the FILMHarmonic Orchestra.

Music video
The music video for the song was released on 30 October 2020. It was directed by Edoardo Ponti, and features a cameo appearance by Sophia Loren, leading actress in the film The Life Ahead, also directed by Ponti and featuring "Io sì (Seen)" as its theme song. 
Reiterating the film's message, the video shows several women close-ups, with the purpose to represent their individual uniqueness, intensity and truthfulness.
In November 2020, Pausini released a backstage video, with scenes taken while shooting the song's official music video.

Accolades

Live performances
Pausini performed the song live at the International Peace Honors on 17 January 2021
and at the virtual ceremony of the 11th Hollywood Music in Media Awards, held on 27 January 2021.
Moreover, on 3 March 2021, following the victory of the song at the 78th Golden Globe Awards for Best Original Song, Pausini was invited as a guest at the second night of the 71st Sanremo Music Festival, where she sang "Io sì (Seen)" with the Sanremo Festival Orchestra. On 25 April she sang the song at the 93rd Academy Awards from the rooftop of the Academy Museum of Motion Pictures in Los Angeles with accompaniment by Diane Warren during the pre-show of the ceremony  and eventually she performed it opening the 66th David di Donatello Awards inside the Teatro dell'Opera di Roma.

Track listing

Charts

Personnel
Production and music credits

References

Laura Pausini songs
2020 singles
2020 songs
2020s ballads
Best Original Song Golden Globe winning songs
Song recordings produced by Greg Wells
Songs written for films
Songs written by Diane Warren
Songs written by Laura Pausini
Songs written by Niccolò Agliardi
Warner Music Group singles
Atlantic Records singles
Songs against racism and xenophobia